S.O.S.: Save Our Soul is the third studio album by Marc Broussard on Vanguard Records.  The album features just one original song, "Come In From The Cold," with cover songs making up the rest of the album.  It debuted and peaked at #96 on the Billboard 200 albums chart, making it his first album to reach the top 100.

As of July 11, 2007, it has sold 12,771 copies in the US.

Track listing
"You Met Your Match" (originally by Stevie Wonder)
"If I Could Build My Whole World Around You" (originally by Marvin Gaye and Tammi Terrell)
"Harry Hippie" (originally by Bobby Womack)
"Let The Music Get Down In Your Soul" (originally by Rance Allen)
"I Love You More Than You'll Ever Know" (originally by Blood, Sweat & Tears)
"Inner City Blues (Make Me Wanna Holler)" (originally by Marvin Gaye)
"Love and Happiness" (originally by Al Green)
"I've Been Loving You Too Long" (originally by Otis Redding)
"Respect Yourself" (originally by The Staple Singers)
"Yes We Can, Can" (originally by The Pointer Sisters)
"Come In From The Cold"
"Bring It On Home To Me" (originally by Sam Cooke) (iTunes/Borders Exclusive Bonus Track)
"Kissing My Love" (originally by Bill Withers) (Circuit City Exclusive Bonus Track)

Personnel
 David Angell - violin
 Marc Broussard - lead vocals
 John Catchings - cello
 Jeff Coffin - flute, tenor saxophone
 Nickie Conley - background vocals
 Chris Dunn - trombone
 Ian Fitchuk - background vocals
 David Ryan Harris - background vocals
 Jon Jackson - alto saxophone, tenor saxophone
 DeMarco Johnson - clavinet, Fender Rhodes, organ, piano, Wurlitzer
 Eric Krasno - electric guitar
 Toby Lightman - background vocals
 Andrew Ramsey - banjo
 Shannon Sanders - organ
 Pam Sixfin - violin
 Akil Thompson - acoustic guitar, electric guitar
 Calvin Turner - bass guitar, trombone, percussion, string arrangements, vibraphone, background vocals
 Kris Wilkinson - viola

Singles
'Love and Happiness' was the first single released off the album.

'Come In From The Cold' was the second single released from the album. It is Marc's first single to have become successful overseas.

References

2007 albums
Marc Broussard albums
Vanguard Records albums